The Chipamanu River or Xipamanu River is a river of Bolivia and Brazil. The river flows through the community of Piçarreira, and forms part of the border between Bolivia and the Brazilian state of Acre.

See also
List of rivers of Bolivia

References
Rand McNally, The New International Atlas, 1993.
Brazilian Ministry of Transport

Rivers of Acre (state)
Rivers of Pando Department